Garudinia successana is a moth of the family Erebidae first described by Francis Walker in 1866. It is found on Sulawesi in Indonesia.

References

Cisthenina
Moths described in 1866